Drws-y-Nant is a village in Gwynedd, Wales.

It was formerly served by the Drws-y-Nant railway station but this closed in 1965.

Villages in Gwynedd
Brithdir and Llanfachreth